Shah-e Shahidan (also Romanized as Shāh-e Shahīdān) is a village in Tasuj Rural District, in the Central District of Kavar County, Fars Province, Iran. At the 2006 census, its population was 379, in 89 families.

References 

Populated places in Kavar County